Hikosaka (written: 彦坂) is a Japanese surname. Notable people with the surname include:

, Japanese rugby sevens player
, Japanese Go player

Japanese-language surnames